The Snob Buster is a 1925 American silent drama film directed by Albert S. Rogell and starring Reed Howes, 
Wilfred Lucas, and George B. French.

Plot
As described in a film magazine review, Theodore Pendergast, the only son in a wealthy Boston family, goes to training camp. A few years later, he returns as a regular guy. With him comes his buddy Butch McGuire, an ex-prize fighter. His family treats Butch with disdain, and insist upon their son undergoing an examination from four mental specialists. They recommend that he go to a private sanitarium. Ted rebels, and goes to live with Butch. He falls in love with the former fighter's sister Molly. To prove his love, he engages in a prize fight his rival, Kid Lowry, in which he is the victor.

Cast
 Reed Howes as Ted Pendergast
 Wilfred Lucas as John Pendergast 
 George B. French as Uncle Tobias 
 David Kirby as Butch McGuire 
 Gloria Grey as Molly McGuire 
 W. Ray Johnston as Kid Lowry 
 Max Asher as Schultz

References

Bibliography
 Darby, William. Masters of Lens and Light: A Checklist of Major Cinematographers and Their Feature Films. Scarecrow Press, 1991.

External links

1925 films
1925 drama films
1920s English-language films
American silent feature films
Silent American drama films
American black-and-white films
Films directed by Albert S. Rogell
Rayart Pictures films
1920s American films